The 2022 Women's Junior AHF Cup, was the sixth edition of the Women's Junior AHF Cup.

It was held at the Taldykorgan Hockey Stadium in Kazakhstan from 12 to 20 October 2022. The top five teams qualified for the 2021 Junior Asia Cup.

Results
Al times are local (UTC+5).

Pool

Fixtures

Classification round

Fifth and sixth place

Third and fourth place

Final

Final standings

See also
 2023 Men's Junior AHF Cup

References

Junior AHF Cup
AHF Cup
Women's Junior AHF Cup
Women's field hockey in Kazakhstan